Project 571 was the numeric codename given to an alleged plot to execute a coup d'état against Chairman Mao Zedong in 1971 by the supporters of Lin Biao, then Vice Chairman of the Chinese Communist Party. In Chinese, the numbers "5-7-1" sound like the term "armed uprising". The Chinese Communist Party initially claimed that Lin Biao himself had devised Project 571, but evidence inside and outside of China has made it more likely that Lin's son, Lin Liguo, a high-ranking officer in the People's Liberation Army Air Force, instead developed the plot. Any plots that may have been planned or attempted by Lin Biao or his family ultimately failed. Lin's family attempted to flee China for the Soviet Union, but died when their plane crashed in Mongolia on September 13, 1971. A draft copy of the Project 571 Outline was discovered following Lin's death, and was publicly circulated by the Chinese government as a means of explaining the event.

Details of the plot 
The Project 571 Outline was not written in the form of a practicable military plan, but more as political declaration. Of the nine sections of the Outline, only two deal directly with military strategy; the remaining sections either criticize the politics of the Cultural Revolution or attack the personality of China's leader, Mao Zedong. Because the writers of the Outline apparently lacked both the military knowledge and the ability to mobilize large groups of forces, Western scholars generally reject the possibility that Lin Biao could have personally planned Project 571.

Of the sections which deal with military strategy, the Outline's authors mention the support of a number of disparate forces, none of which was overwhelmingly powerful. The plotters believed they were supported by the equivalent of approximately six to eight Air Force divisions: the Fourth and Fifth Air Force Corps; the Ninth, Eighteenth, and Thirty-Fourth Air Force Divisions; the Thirty-Fourth Tank Regiment; and (perhaps unusually) the Bureau of Civilian Aviation. The authors also noted that they expected the support of an "auxiliary force" composed of the Twentieth and Thirty-Eighth Armies (Lin Biao's own elite units) and several provinces, which were only vaguely mentioned. The power of this combination of  forces was not great, compared to the rest of the People's Liberation Army, and the authors of the Outline noted that "at present the preparation of our strength is still not adequate".

The military plans contained in the Outline were below the standards that could have been expected from Lin Biao, one of modern China's most successful generals. Because Lin Biao was a master of maneuvering ground forces, it is unusual that he would have relied almost exclusively on the Air Force, even though his own elite forces were readily available to him. In the Chinese Civil War, Lin had become a master of delaying decisive confrontations until he knew that the chances of victory had become overwhelming, and scholars note that it would have been out of character for Lin to have staked his political career on such a poorly planned military coup, whose chances of success were slim. There is no direct evidence that suggests that either Lin or his generals were involved in the coup plot. Many scholars believe that his son, Lin Liguo, a high-ranking officer in the People's Liberation Air Force, was instead the author. Within China, the theory that Lin Liguo drafted the Project 571 Outline was corroborated by the testimony of Lin Biao's generals in the special trials of the "Lin Biao and Jiang Qing Counter-Revolutionary Cliques", which were held in 1980.

History of the plot
Following Lin's death in 1971, the Chinese government initially charged Lin Biao with personally planning Project 571. After the testimony of Li Weixin (the only one of the alleged plotters to have survived 1971), and the 1980 testimony of General Huang Yongsheng (a former military chief-of-staff whose role in the plot was implied by the testimony of Li Weixin), sources within China have generally come to recognize that Lin Liguo devised the plot independently of Lin Biao. Western scholars have been critical of the Chinese government's perspective since 1971, and generally state that Lin Liguo was the author of the plot. Some Western historians question whether Lin Biao was even aware of Lin Liguo's plans at all.

According to a modern standard Chinese narrative of Lin Biao's plot, Lin Biao became aware that Mao no longer trusted him after the Second Plenum of the 9th National Congress of the Chinese Communist Party in 1970, and he harbored a strong desire to seize supreme power. In February 1971, Lin and his wife Ye Qun (who was then a Politburo member) began to plot Mao's assassination. In March 1971, Lin Liguo  held a secret meeting with his closest followers at an Air Force base in Shanghai. At this meeting, Lin Liguo and his subordinates supposedly drafted Project 571. Later that March, the group met again to formalize the structure of command following the proposed coup. The other major plotters were high-ranking military officers, including Zhou Yuchi, Yu Xinye, and Li Weixin.

From March 23 to 24, Yu Xinye drafted the Project 571 Outline, the original manuscript of which was said to have been recovered after the death of the coup plotters. In the Outline, Lin Liguo's party listed a total of eight ways to eliminate Mao Zedong. Among them were blowing up his train, collapsing a railway bridge as his train was crossing it, using napalm, and simply using a handgun to assassinate him.

Mao was unaware of the coup plot, but in August 1971 he scheduled a conference for September to determine the political fate of Lin Biao. On August 15, Mao left Beijing to discuss the issue with other senior political and military leaders in southern China. On September 5, Lin received reports that Mao was preparing to purge him. On September 8, Lin decided to speed up the coup and gave the order to his subordinates to proceed with Mao's assassination, under the direction of Lin Liguo and Zhang Yuchi (who was then the deputy director of the Office of the Air Force Headquarters).

Lin's subordinates planned to assassinate Mao by sabotaging his train before he returned to Beijing, but Mao unexpectedly changed his route on September 11. Mao's bodyguards foiled several subsequent attempts on his life, and Mao safely returned to Beijing in the evening of September 12. By failing to assassinate Mao, the coup attempt associated with Project 571 failed.

After realizing that their coup attempt had failed, Lin's party first considered fleeing south to their power base in Guangzhou, where they would establish an alternative power base and cooperate with the Soviet Union to attack armed forces loyal to Mao. After hearing that Prime Minister Zhou Enlai was investigating the incident, they abandoned this plan as impractical, and decided to flee to the Soviet Union instead. In the early morning of September 13, Lin Biao, Ye Qun, Lin Liguo, and most of the other major plotters attempted to flee to the Soviet Union and boarded a prearranged Trident 1-E, (a CAAC B-256) piloted by Pan Jingyin, the deputy commander of the PLAAF 34th division. But the plane did not take enough fuel on board before taking off. It ran out of fuel and crashed near Öndörkhaan in Mongolia on September 13, 1971. Everyone on board, eight men and one woman, were killed.

After September 12, a massive purge of the armed forces took place. All military officials identified as being close to Lin or his family (most of China's high military command) were purged within weeks of Lin's disappearance. Within a month of Lin's disappearance, over 1,000 senior Chinese military officials were purged. After he was confident that all of the alleged plotters were either dead or arrested, Mao Zedong had copies of the Project 571 Outline widely circulated among cadres in the Chinese Communist Party (relatively senior members only: level 19 and above; level 18 earned 87 yuan a month and a special ration of 500g of white sugar, level 1 earned 600 yuan). The official Chinese version of events was drafted by Zhang Chunqiao and his subordinates under Mao's personal supervision.

Codes used in the outline

 "B-52" referred to Mao Zedong.
 "Enemy Capital Ship" (敌主力舰 dí zhǔlì jiàn) referred to Mao's supporters.
 "Trotskyist Writers" (笔杆子托派 bǐgǎnzi Tuō Pài) referred to Zhang Chunqiao and Yao Wenyuan
 "Wang, Chen and Jiang" (王、陈、江) were Wang Weiguo, Chen Liyun and Jiang Tengjiao, some of Lin Biao's supporters.
 "Project 01" (01工程 líng yī gōngchéng) references a dispatch telegraph whose design was masterminded by Lin Liguo.
 Etajima, site of the Imperial Japanese Naval Academy where Kamikaze pilots were indoctrinated in the spiritual training of Bushido.
 "Death before dishonor" (不成功便成仁 bù chénggōng biàn chéngrén), a slogan that Chiang Kai-shek used to train his cadres.
 China itself was referred to as a "feudal dynasty disguised as a socialist country".

See also
 Criticize Lin, Criticize Confucius campaign

Footnotes

Bibliography
 Hannam, Peter, and Lawrence, Susan V. "Solving a Chinese Puzzle: Lin Biao's Final Days and Death, After Two Decades of Intrigue". U.S. News & World Report. January 23, 1994. Retrieved November 21, 2011.
 He, Henry Yuhuai.  Dictionary of the Political Thought of the People's Republic of China.  United States of America: East Gate. 2001. . Retrieved November 12, 2011.

External links

Cultural Revolution
Maoist China
1971 in China
Coup d'état attempts in Asia
1970s coups d'état and coup attempts